Gordiichthys is a genus of eels in the snake eel family Ophichthidae. It currently contains the following species:

 Gordiichthys combibus McCosker & Lavenberg, 2001
 Gordiichthys ergodes McCosker, E. B. Böhlke & J. E. Böhlke, 1989 (Irksome eel)
 Gordiichthys irretitus D. S. Jordan & B. M. Davis, 1891 (Horsehair eel)
 Gordiichthys leibyi McCosker & J. E. Böhlke, 1984 (String eel)
 Gordiichthys randalli McCosker & J. E. Böhlke, 1984

References

 

Ophichthidae
Taxa named by David Starr Jordan